Lero, the Science Foundation Ireland Research Centre for Software, Ireland, is a world-leading Science Foundation Ireland (SFI) research centre. It was established in 2005 as an SFI Centre for Science Engineering and Technology (CSET), being one of nine (originally ten) such centres established by the Irish Government in various areas of science and engineering.

Overview 
Hosted at University of Limerick, Lero, the Science Foundation Ireland Research Centre for Software, is home to around 250 active researchers across eight Irish universities and three Institutes of Technology. Its research spans a wide range of application domains from driverless cars to artificial intelligence, cybersecurity, fintech, govtech, smart communities, agtech and healthtech.

Lero brings together researchers from University of Limerick, Dublin City University, Trinity College Dublin, University College Dublin, Maynooth University, National University of Ireland Galway, University College Cork, Munster Technological University, Dundalk Institute of Technology, Waterford Institute of Technology and Limerick Institute of Technology. 

As the world’s second largest software exporter, Ireland is recognised internationally as a leading location for companies in the software sector and Lero is a key pillar of that. Fifteen out of the top 20 global technology firms have strategic operations in Ireland. Lero actively engages with industry and currently has in the region of 50 industry partners.

Leadership 
Lero's first Centre Director was Professor Kevin T Ryan and its Scientific Director was Professor Klaus Pohl. Professor Mike Hinchey was appointed Director of Lero in mid-2010. Professor Bashar Nuseibeh served as Chief Scientist from 2010 to 2014 and was succeeded by Professor Brian Fitzgerald. In 2016, Professor Fitzgerald was appointed Director of Lero and continues to lead the centre today. Professor Nuseibeh returned to the role of Chief Scientist, a position he holds today.

Joe Gibbs was appointed General Manager in 2018 replacing Brendan O’Malley. Mr Gibbs previously held the role of Business Development Manager at the centre.

References

Educational institutions established in 2005
University of Limerick
Research institutes in the Republic of Ireland
Software engineering organizations
2005 establishments in Ireland